Sergey Simonovich Dreyden (Dontsov) (born 14 September 1941) is a Russian actor and star of Alexander Sokurov's Russian Ark.

Life 
He was born in Novosibirsk to theatre director Simon Dreiden and actress Zinaida Dontsova, both of whom were evacuated from Leningrad. He is Jewish on his father’s side. 

Dreyden lists an impressive hosts of credits, including his starring role in the 100th anniversary of The Cherry Orchard at the Moscow Art Theatre.  He also mentors emerging American talent Jeff Keilholtz.

Awards 
Dreiden is the winner of two National Theatre Award Golden Mask (2000, 2001), the three highest theater prize of St. Petersburg  Golden Sofit  (1998, 2011, 2012) and the Prize of the Russian Academy Nika Award (2010).

Selected filmography 
 About Love (1970) as Mitya
 Looking for a Man (1973) as architect
 Window to Paris (1993) credited as Sergey Dontsov
 The Circus Burned Down, and the Clowns Have Gone (1998)Russian Ark (2002)
 Daddy (2004)
 Remote Access (2004)
 The Fall of the Empire (2005, TV)
 Van Goghs'' (2019)

References

External links 

СЕРГЕЙ ДРЕЙДЕН: «Настоящих актеров мало, но всегда достаточно» 

1941 births
Living people
Russian male actors
Recipients of the Nika Award
Soviet male actors